Pinball FX 3 is a pinball simulator video game developed and published by Zen Studios and released for Microsoft Windows, Xbox One, PlayStation 4 in September 2017 and then released for the Nintendo Switch in December 2017.

Gameplay
Pinball FX 3 allows players to play one of several simulated pinball tables, and includes online scoreboard support for informal competition with other players. The game is aimed to provide a more engaging multiplayer experience than previous titles; the game will provide support for asynchronous competitive multiplayer options, and tournament-style play. There will be shared leaderboards and multiplayer options among platforms, although PlayStation 4 players can only compete with users playing through Steam on Windows due to Sony's initial decision to prohibit cross-platform play between its PlayStation 4 and other consoles.

Development
Zen's prior games have been split across consoles. The Pinball FX games typically have been released on Microsoft platforms, while the Zen Pinball games were released on non-Microsoft platforms.  Pinball FX 3 will be the first game in the series to target both Microsoft and non-Microsoft platforms, and Zen intends that any future titles in the series will do so as well.  Zen has stated that a "majority" of the previous downloadable content pinball tables that a player has purchased for either Pinball FX 2 or Zen Pinball 2 will be available in Pinball FX 3 at no cost; Zen cited issues with licensing that prevents some tables from being brought to the new version. Zen Studios has affirmed that more than fifty tables will carry over, with only about half a dozen that will not.

Pinball FX 3 launched with three new tables based on movie properties from Universal Pictures that includes E.T. the Extra-Terrestrial, Back to the Future, and Jaws. Additional tables are in development with new intellectual property holders.

A version for the Nintendo Switch was released in December 2017, with one free table and 29 additional tables that can be purchased as DLC. The Switch version takes advantage of the unit's portability; the game can be played in portrait mode and the player can tilt the device to simulate tilting of the pinball table. However, following release, players reported issues with low frame rates and poor graphics on some of the tables; while Zen Studios has said they were working on a patch to fix these as well as make other display improvements, the studio later announced in March 2018 that they had to forgo the patch citing that there was no universal fix as the issue was one done table-by-table; they can optimize tables going forward but could not justify the time and cost to fix the existing ones. Reacting on the negative backlash of this announcement, the studio later reverted on this stance and is now committed to releasing a performance update during summer 2018 that will increase handheld performance to 60fps and will raise docked resolution to 1080p Full HD for all existing tables.  The Switch version also omits Zen Studios' Marvel and Star Wars pinball tables, with the latter being made available separately as a single, standalone compilation game exclusive to that platform, titled Star Wars Pinball, in 2019.

In September 2018, Zen Studios announced that it has received the license to recreate several real Bally and Williams tables for the game. This marks the first time in the Pinball FX series that real world tables are recreated in the game. This announcement came a few months after FarSight Studios, the developers of The Pinball Arcade, lost the same license. These tables can be played in two visual modes that otherwise do not impact the game: one based on the more realistic appearance of the actual pinball games, and another that added Pinbal FX 3s simulated elements like animated characters, and unique ball trail colors. However, as to retain the game's overall ESRB Everyone 10+ rating and to avoid the cost and difficulties of re-rating the game, original graphical elements of the pinball tables had to be censored or altered, such as altering innuendo that was present on the Fish Tales backboards. Zen Studios' Mel Kirk said that while these tables had been released in The Pinball Arcade under its E10+ ESRB rating, Zen Studios' internal review believed that there was no way that the tables could have fallen within E10+. Kirk stated that he believed that with  The Pinball Arcade, "somehow they flew under the radar and it was not caught". Further, Zen Studios had had past issues with ESRB content ratings with games such as Infinite Minigolf and wanted to exercise caution.  The first of these tables were released on October 9, 2018.

Tables
Free Table
Sorcerer's Lair
Core Collection
Pasha
Rome
Biolab
Secrets of the deep
Sci-Fi Pack
Mars
Paranormal
Earth Defense
Medieval pack
Epic Quest
Excalibur 
Iron & Steel Pack
CastleStorm
Wild West Rampage
Zen Classics
Shaman
Tesla
El Dorado
V12
Carnivals & Legends 
Adventure Land Pinball
Son of Zeus
The Walking Dead Pinball
Universal Classics
E.T. the Extra-Terrestrial 
Back to the Future
Jaws
Jurassic World
Jurassic World 
Jurassic Park
Jurassic Park Pinball Mayhem
Aliens vs. Pinball
Aliens Pinball
Alien: Isolation Pinball
Alien vs. Predator Pinball
Star Wars Pinball
Star Wars Pinball: The Last Jedi
Star Wars: The Last Jedi 
Star Wars: Ahch-To Island
Star Wars Pinball: Solo Pack
Solo: A Star Wars Story 
Calrissian Chronicles
Star Wars: Battle of Mimban
Star Wars Pinball (original)
Star Wars: Episode V The Empire Strikes Back
The Clone Wars
Boba Fett
Star Wars Pinball: Unsung Heroes
Star Wars Pinball: Rogue One
Star Wars Pinball: Star Wars Rebels
Star Wars Pinball: Balance of the Force
Star Wars: Episode VI Return of the Jedi
Starfighter Assault
Darth Vader
Star Wars Pinball: Heroes Within
Han Solo
Star Wars Pinball: Droids
Star Wars: Episode IV A New Hope
Star Wars Pinball: Masters of the Force
Star Wars Pinball: The Force Awakens
Star Wars Pinball: The Force Awakens
Star Wars Pinball: Might of the First Order
Marvel Pinball
Marvel Pinball Cinematic Pack
The Avengers: Age of Ultron
Ant-Man
Guardians of the Galaxy
Marvel Pinball Heavy Hitters
Venom
Deadpool
Civil War
Marvel Pinball Legends
Captain America
Doctor Strange
Fantastic Four
Marvel Pinball Women of Power
Champions
A-Force
Marvel Pinball Avengers Chronicles
The Avengers
Fear Itself
The Infinity Gauntlet
World War Hulk
Marvel Pinball Original Pack
Spider-Man
Wolverine
Iron Man
Blade
Marvel Pinball Vengeance & Virtue
Ghost Rider
Moon Knight
Thor
X-Men
Portal Pinball
Bethesda
Fallout
DOOM
The Elder Scrolls V: Skyrim
Balls of Glory
Family Guy
American Dad!
Bob's Burgers
Archer
Williams Pinball
Free Table
Fish Tales
Volume 1
The Getaway: High Speed II
Junk Yard
Medieval Madness
Volume 2
The Party Zone
Black Rose
Attack from Mars
Volume 3
Theatre of Magic
The Champion Pub
Safe Cracker
Volume 4
White Water
Hurricane
Red & Ted's Road Show
Volume 5
Tales of the Arabian Nights
Cirqus Voltaire
No Good Gofers
Volume 6
FunHouse
Space Station
Dr. Dude and His Excellent Ray
Williams Pinball: Universal Monsters Pack
Creature from the Black Lagoon 
Monster Bash
Indiana Jones: The Pinball Adventure

Accolades
The game was nominated for the Central Park Children's Zoo Award for Best Kids Game at the New York Game Awards 2018, and won the award for "Game, Special Class" at the National Academy of Video Game Trade Reviewers Awards.

Notes

References

2017 video games
Nintendo Switch games
Pinball video games
PlayStation 4 games
PlayStation Network games
Video games developed in Hungary
Video games with cross-platform play
Windows games
Xbox One games
Xbox Play Anywhere games
Video games based on Marvel Comics
Zen Studios games
Multiplayer and single-player video games